Troja became part of Prague in 1922. Now it is part of the district of Prague 7 and its own cadastral area.

The area is 3.36 km2, the population is 1,272 and the population density is 379 inhabitants / km2.

In Troja are also Vineyards (vineyards vinice svaté Kláry and Salabka).

Due to its premium location, Troja has long been an attractive Prague district for many successful Czechs from business, sports or arts, among them  Michael Kocáb, Dana Zátopková, Emil Zátopek, Bohdan Ulihrach or Věra Chytilová.

References 

Districts of Prague